Hangover remedies consist of foods, dishes, and medicines, that have been described as having a theoretical potential for easing or alleviating symptoms associated with the hangover.

List of hangover foods

Scientific

 Asparagus: In a small cell-based study, concentrated asparagus leaf extract showed marginal harmful by-product scavenging capabilities. This may mean that there is physiological effect, but further research is necessary.
 Foods that contain:
 Cysteine
 gamma-Linolenic acid
 Drinking water
 Common pear was found to have the highest effect on Aldehyde dehydrogenase activity.

Folk cures

The following foods and dishes have been described as having a theoretical potential for easing or alleviating symptoms associated with the hangover. Hangover foods have not been scientifically proven to function as a remedy or cure for the hangover.
 Alcohol – hair of the dog remedy
 Bloody mary or in Canada, the Caesar.
 Corpse Reviver
 Fernet – an alcoholic beverage consumed as a drink choice to avoid the hangover
 Jägerbomb
 Underberg – a digestif bitter
 Vodka

 Water rich foods:
 Fruits
 Banana
 Kiwifruit
 Prickly pear fruit
 Drinks
 Caffeinated drinks: No significant correlation between caffeine use and hangover severity has been found.
 Coffee
 Espresso
 Electrolyte replacement drinks
 Pedialyte
 Sports drinks
 Juices
 Fruit juice
 Pickle juice
 Tomato juice
 Teas
 Ginger tea
 Green tea
 Peppermint tea
 Coconut water
Hangover drinks in South Korea – Mass-produced hangover drinks based on Traditional Korean medicine.
 Vegetables
 Spinach
 Tomato
Hovenia dulcis
 Soups
 Aguadito de pollo – a soup in Peruvian cuisine consisting of chicken, cilantro, vegetables and spices
 Aguadito – a chunky Peruvian soup made with cilantro, carrot, peas and potatoes
 Ajiaco
 Cesnecka – A soup in Czech cuisine that is prepared using a significant amount of garlic
 Chicken noodle soup
 Fricasé – A soup in Bolivian cuisine prepared with ribs, hominy and potatoes
 Haejang-guk – or hangover soup refers to all kinds of guk or soup eaten as a hangover cure in Korean cuisine. It means "soup to chase a hangover" and is also called sulguk.
 Menudo
 Miso soup
 Zurek
 Tripe soups
 Eggs. Egg dishes:
 Ostrich egg omelette – consumed as a hangover food in South Africa
 Fry up – a British full breakfast
 Loco moco
 Omelette
 Prairie oyster – a cocktail served as a hangover remedy that consists of raw egg, Worcestershire sauce, tomato juice, vinegar, hot sauce, salt and ground black pepper.
 Ramen
 Shakshuka
 Greasy foods
 Bacon sandwich
 Chicken fillet roll
 Hamburger
 Peanut butter
 Pizza
 Fried foods
 Churros
 Fried chicken
 Grilled cheese sandwich
 Poutine
 Chilaquiles
 Revuelto Gramajo – a breakfast hash dish in Argentine cuisine consisting of potatoes, eggs, cheese and vegetables.
 Youtiao
 Staple food
 Toast, and toast and honey
 Oats and oatmeal
 Spaghetti
 Quinoa
 Cassoulet
 Ceviche
 Congee
 Dal bhat
 Drunken noodles
 Honey
 Kishkiyya – a porridge in Iraqi cuisine from the 10th century that was consumed in Baghdad, it was prepared using ground wheat and meat.
 Luwombo – A dish in Ugandan cuisine consisting of meat, peanuts called luwombo and vegetables that is steamed in a banana leaf and typically served with a side dish of plantains.
 Mustard
 Sushi
 Guobacai – A snack of strong local flavor in Tianjin cuisine, guobacai is a sort of pancake made of millet and mung bean flour.
 Torta ahogada

Criticism
While recommendations and folk cures for foods and drinks to relieve hangover symptoms abound, hangover foods have not been scientifically proven to function as a remedy or cure for the hangover.

In a review assessing eight randomised controlled trials of propranolol, tropisetron, tolfenamic acid, fructose/glucose, a yeast preparation and supplements containing Borago officinalis, Cynara scolymus and Opuntia ficus-indica, researchers concluded that "no compelling evidence exists to suggest that any conventional or complementary intervention is effective for preventing or treating alcohol hangover."

Medicines
 N-Acetylcysteine
 Sobrietol
 Tolfenamic acid

Ineffective
 Activated charcoal

History
Various folk medicine remedies exist for hangovers. The ancient Romans, on the authority of Pliny the Elder, favored raw owl's eggs or fried canary as a hangover remedy, while the "prairie oyster" restorative, introduced at the 1878 Paris World Exposition, calls for raw egg yolk mixed with Worcestershire sauce, Tabasco sauce, salt and pepper. By 1938, the Ritz-Carlton Hotel provided a hangover remedy in the form of a mixture of Coca-Cola and milk (Coca-Cola itself having been invented, by some accounts, as a hangover remedy). Alcoholic writer Ernest Hemingway relied on tomato juice and beer.

Other purported hangover cures includes more alcohol, for example cocktails such as Bloody Mary or Black Velvet (consisting of equal parts champagne and stout).

A 1957 survey by an American folklorist found widespread belief in the efficacy of heavy fried foods, tomato juice and sexual activity.

References

Further reading

External links
 How to avoid a hangover: Dehydration, chemical build up and nutrient depletion – your body on a hangover (and how to fix it). Healthista.com.

Alcohol abuse
Drinking culture
Food and drink culture
Alternative detoxification